Jeremiah Ngayu Kioni is a Kenyan politician. He was elected to represent the Ndaragwa Constituency until 2013 in the National Assembly of Kenya in the 2007 Kenyan parliamentary election. He was re-elected in 2017. Jeremiah Kioni issued a threat of PNU pulling out of the Grand Coalition because of what he termed continued frustration by the ODM party over Mwai Kibaki judiciary nominations.
He is a friend of Jamleck Irungu Kamau.

On January 22, 2013, Kioni was selected as the vice presidential running mate for the 2013 general election, but was not elected.

See also
Politics of Kenya

References

Living people
Year of birth missing (living people)
Party of National Unity (Kenya) politicians
Members of the National Assembly (Kenya)
University of Nairobi alumni